Chris Hegarty may refer to:
 Chris Hegarty (footballer, born 1984), Scottish footballer
 Chris Hegarty (footballer, born 1992), Northern Irish footballer